Junko Kudo, alias Junko, Junko Bashment or Dancehall Queen Junko, is a Japanese professional dancer, specialising in reggae dance, known internationally in reggae circles as the first foreign "Dancehall Queen".

Biography
Under the nickname of Junko Bashment, aged 24 in April 2002, she became the first non-Jamaican, in Montego Bay, Jamaica, to win the official female dance tournament for "dancehall reggae" music and took the $50,000 prize, and as a consequence took the title of "Dancehall Queen", after two years of practice and a background in classical ballet. With her victory, she opened the door for dancers from around the world to compete. Known in the reggae world under the nickname Dancehall Queen Junko (or sometimes simply Junko after losing her title), she has since featured in videos, shows, and concerts "sound systems" in reggae music around the world, including in France. She also teaches dance in Japan, and has released DVDs teaching and demonstrating as an artist and producer, and popularising Jamaican culture in Japan. A television report dedicated to Junko was part of the British television programme Japanorama shown on 21 September 2006 on BBC Three.

Artistic career

Dance
Dancehall Queen Junko video appearances has included videos from Elephant Man like "Pon Di River". She is also in the 2006 Dutty Wine video by Tony Matterhorn.

DVD

 2006/02/14 : High School Dancehall – DVD Magazine Volume 1 – Produced By Junko
 2006/08/10 : Dance Style Reggae 2 – Junko
 2008/03/25 : Dance Hall Queen Junko presents: Reggae Channel – World Dance

Notes and references

External links
 Official blog at Ameba: ''Bashment – DANCEHALL QUEEN JUNKO OFFICIAL BLOG
 Former official blog: DANCEHALL QUEEN JUNKO 's BLOG

Reggae culture
Japanese female dancers
Living people
Year of birth missing (living people)